Baxenden railway station served the villages of Baxenden in Hyndburn and Rising Bridge in Rossendale. The station gave its name to the nearby Baxenden Bank, the two-mile section towards Accrington that included gradients as steep as 1 in 38.

The Accrington Corporation Steam Tramways Company built a tramline from Accrington in 1887 that terminated at the station. The station closed to passengers in 1951, some fifteen years before the line serving it suffered a similar fate.

References

Disused railway stations in Hyndburn
Former Lancashire and Yorkshire Railway stations
Railway stations in Great Britain opened in 1848
Railway stations in Great Britain closed in 1951